Scott Adamson (1906–1962) was a Rhodesian cricketer, who played for Rhodesia in first-class cricket.

References

External links
 

1906 births
1962 deaths
Zimbabwean cricketers
Rhodesia cricketers